Gergő Gohér (born 16 June 1987) is a Hungarian footballer who plays for Szolnok.

Club career
In July 2021, Gohér returned to Szolnok.

Club statistics

Updated to games played as of 30 June 2020.

Club honours

Szolnoki MÁV FC
Hungarian National Championship II: Runners-up: 2007–08

Diósgyőri VTK
Hungarian National Championship II (1): Winner: 2010–11
Hungarian League Cup (1): 2013–14

References

1987 births
Living people
People from Hatvan
Hungarian footballers
Association football central defenders
Ferencvárosi TC footballers
III. Kerületi TUE footballers
Szolnoki MÁV FC footballers
Diósgyőri VTK players
Budapest Honvéd FC players
Puskás Akadémia FC players
Soroksár SC players
Mezőkövesdi SE footballers
Budafoki LC footballers
Nemzeti Bajnokság I players
Nemzeti Bajnokság II players
Nemzeti Bajnokság III players
Sportspeople from Heves County